Charles Conde  (1859 – March 1936) was a Welsh international footballer. He was part of the Wales national football team, playing 3 matches. He played his first match on 9 February 1884 against Ireland and his last match on 29 March 1884 against Scotland.

See also
 List of Wales international footballers (alphabetical)

References

1859 births
1936 deaths
People from Chirk
Sportspeople from Wrexham County Borough
Welsh footballers
Wales international footballers
Association football defenders